Bright Angel Creek is an American body of water located at the bottom of the Grand Canyon National Park flowing into the Colorado River at the end of the North Kaibab Trail on the north side of the river.  The creek originates from Roaring Springs that emerge from a cliff along the North Kaibab Trail and drains to the Colorado.  The North Kaibab Trail largely follows the creek, including through "the Box," a narrow, high-walled part of the trail that becomes extremely hot in daylight during the summer months (April to October).

The confluence of the creek with the Colorado River flows through eroded canyons and debris of one of the base units of Granite Gorge on the river, the Vishnu Shist.

Fish species
 Rainbow trout
 Brown trout
 Brook trout

See also
 List of Arizona rivers
 List of tributaries of the Colorado River

External links
 Arizona Boating Locations Facilities Map
 Arizona Fishing Locations Map

Rivers of Arizona
Grand Canyon